The Gerhard Löwenthal Prize is an award for "liberal-conservative journalism" in Germany. Endowed by German "Foundation for Conservative Education and Research", it is awarded in cooperation with national-conservative newspaper Junge Freiheit and Ingeborg Löwenthal, widow of conservative journalist and Holocaust survivor Gerhard Löwenthal. Issued annually between 2004 and 2009, it has since been awarded only biannually. The prize money is 5,000 euros.

Recipients of the Gerhard Löwenthal Prize
Recipients of the prize have been:
 2004 – Thorsten Hinz, writes for Preußische Allgemeine Zeitung and Sezession
 2005 – Stefan Scheil, historian
 2006 – Thomas Paulwitz, founder of the magazine Deutsche Sprachwelt
 2007 – Andreas Krause Landt, founder of the Landt Verlag
 2008 – Ellen Kositza, author
 2009 – André F. Lichtschlag, founder of the magazine eigentümlich frei
 2011 – Michael Paulwitz, writes for Sezession
 2013 – Birgit Kelle, journalist
 2015 – Martin Voigt, freelancer
 2017 – Sabatina James, journalist
 2019 – Alexander Wendt, journalist

Recipients of the Gerhard Löwenthal honorary prize
A special honorary prize has been awarded to:
 2004 – Herbert Fleissner
 2005 – Caspar von Schrenck-Notzing
 2006 – Elisabeth Noelle-Neumann
 2007 – Wolf Jobst Siedler
 2008 – Peter Scholl-Latour
 2009 – Helmut Matthies
 2011 – Ernst Nolte
 2013 – Karl Feldmeyer
 2015 – Heimo Schwilk
 2017 – Bruno Bandulet
 2019 – Vera Lengsfeld

References

External links
 

German journalism awards
Awards by newspapers
Conservatism in Germany
Awards established in 2004
2004 establishments in Germany